Dacalana is a genus of butterflies in the family Lycaenidae.  The genus is distributed from Assam through Sundaland to Sulawesi, and is especially richly represented in the Philippines.

Species
Dacalana cotys Hewitson
Dacalana lowii H.H.Druce
Dacalana anysis Hewitson
Dacalana burmana Moore
Dacalana sinhara Fruhstorfer
Dacalana capusa Fruhstorfer
Dacalana penicilligera de Nicéville
Dacalana cremera de Nicéville
Dacalana sannio Druce
Dacalana aristarchus Fruhstorfer
Dacalana kurosawai H. Hayashi
Dacalana monsapona Schröder & Treadaway
Dacalana akayamai H. Hayashi, Schröder & Treadaway
Dacalana liaoi H. Hayashi, Schröder & Treadaway
Dacalana irmae H. Hayashi, Schröder & Treadaway
Dacalana mio H. Hayashi, Schröder & Treadaway
Dacalana polyorketes Fruhstorfer
Dacalana treadawayi H. Hayashi 
Dacalana lucillae H. Hayashi, Schröder & Treadaway

References
 Seitz, A., 1924-1927: The Macrolepidoptera of the World, 9: 903-1026. Stuttgart.
 Eliot J.N., 1992: In Corbet & Pendlebury. The Butterflies of the Malay Peninsula, 4th edn. x+595pp, 69pls. Kuala Lumpur.  
 Treadaway, Colin G., 1995: Checklist of the butterflies of the Philippine Islands. Nachrichten des Entomologischen Vereins Apoll, Suppl. 14: 7-118. 
 Vane-Wright, R.I. & de Jong, R., 2003: The butterflies of Sulawesi: annotated checklist for a critical island fauna. Zoologische Verhandelingen 343;132-133. 
 Treadaway, Colin G. & Schrőder, Heinz,2012: Revised checklist of the butterflies of the Philippine Islands. Nachrichten des Entomologischen Vereins Apoll, Suppl. 20: 1-64.

 
Iolaini
Lycaenidae genera
Taxa named by Frederic Moore